Minerva was built in the Americas in 1791 and taken in prize from the Spanish. She made six voyages as a slave ship in the triangular trade in enslaved people. She is last listed in 1813 but with data stale since her last slave voyage in 1807.

Career
Minerva first appeared in Lloyd's Register (LR) in 1799 with Cowley, master, Calvert & Co., owners, and trade London–Africa. She was almost rebuilt in 1799 as well.

1st slave voyage (1799–1801): Captain Richard Coley sailed from London on 28 July 1799. Minerva acquired her slaves at Cape Coast Castle and arrived at Demerara on 12 August 1800. There she landed 359 slaves. She arrived back at London on 18 January 1801. On 6 January Lloyd's List reported that Minerva, Cooley, master, had parted from her anchors at pithead and put into Portsmouth. She was on her way from Berbice to London.

2nd slave voyage (1801–1802): Captain Coley sailed from London on 4 August 1801. Minerva started acquiring slaves 18 November. She acquired her slaves at Cape Coast Castle and arrived with them at Havana on 1 May 1802. She landed 248 slaves. She returned to London on 22 August.

3rd slave voyage (1802–1804): Captain Coley sailed from London on 23 November 1802. He started acquiring slaves on 29 January 1803, stopping at Elmina, Cape Coast Castle, and Accra. On 13 May 1803 Lloyd's List (LL) reported that Minerva, Coley, master, had arrived at Africa. The same report mentioned that , Silcock, master, had also arrived there. Minerva, arrived at Demerara on 3 December 1803 and landed 220 slaves. She left Demerara on 8 February 1804 with M'Iver, master, and arrived at London on 30 April.Lloyd's Register for 1804 showed Minerva with H.Coley, master, changing to J.M'Iver, T. King, owner, and trade London–Africa. It also showed her burthen as 248 tons.

4th slave voyage (1804–1805): Captain George Adams sailed from London on 2 September 1804. Minerva started acquiring slaves on the Gold Coast on 16 November. She arrived at Cumingsberg (British Guiana), on 7 March 1805. There she landed 256 slaves. She left on 1 April and arrived back at London on 10 June.

5th slave voyage (1805–1806): Captain James Boswell left London on 5 July 1805. Minerva acquired her slaves at Accra and landed 116 slaves at Demerara on 6 May 1806. She arrived back at London on 30 September.

6th slave voyage (1807): Captain Boswell sailed from London on 9 February 1807. He acquired Minervas slaves at Cape Coast Castle and Accra, and arrived at Kingston, Jamaica, on 1 August. There she landed 253 slaves.

The Slave Trade Act 1807 banned the slave trade within the British Empire. Because Minerva had left before the deadline of 1 May 1807, her voyage was still legal.

Fate
There is no record in Lloyd's Lists ship arrival and departure data of Minervas return to England. She was lasted in LR and RS'' until 1813, but with stale data.

Citations

Captured ships
1791 ships
Age of Sail merchant ships of England
London slave ships